FreakyLinks is an American science fiction series that combined elements of horror, mystery, and comedy. It aired on  Fox from October 2000 until June 2001, for a total run of 13 episodes. The feel of the show closely modeled that of The X-Files and other supernatural-themed shows that were popular at the time.

Setting and plot
FreakyLinks centered on Derek Barnes (played by Ethan Embry), who, assisted by his friends Chloe (Lisa Sheridan) and Jason (Karim Prince), ran a website called "FreakyLinks.com" that sought out the dark and forbidden truths behind paranormal phenomena and urban legends.

Derek took over the site after his twin brother, Adam, died under mysterious circumstances. The show's episodes revolved around Derek and his friends investigating supernatural claims for the website and uncovering clues that might reveal the truth of his brother's fate.

Cast
Ethan Embry as Derek Barnes / Adam Barnes
Lisa Sheridan as Chloe Tanner
Karim Prince as Jason Tatum
Lizette Carrion as Lan Williams
Dennis Christopher as Vince J. Elsing

Production and marketing
FreakyLinks, originally titled Fearsum until a few months before airing, was developed by Haxan, the creators of the film The Blair Witch Project.

Haxan decided to follow a marketing strategy similar to Blair Witch's and created a website, long before the show was set to air, called "Freakylinks.com," which was cleverly designed to look like an amateurish, home-brew website made by real-life paranormal enthusiasts.

The website was fairly successful and seemed to create some amount of "buzz," but this did not translate into high ratings when the show finally aired. The show went on hiatus for a few months before returning to the air to finish out the season, but it was not renewed for the next fall television season.

An online petition was created to ask the Fox Network to bring the show back for another season, however this was unsuccessful.

Episodes

References

Los Angeles Times
Entertainment Weekly
NY Daily News
The New York Times
Deseret News
The Western Courier
Entertainment Weekly
The Complete Directory to Prime Time Network and Cable TV Shows, 1946–Present

External links
Freakylinks.com  – The original Freakylinks.com website, now part of Haxan's portfolio

2000 American television series debuts
2001 American television series endings
2000s American comedy-drama television series
2000s American comic science fiction television series
2000s American horror comedy television series
2000s American mystery television series
English-language television shows
Fox Broadcasting Company original programming
Television series created by David S. Goyer
Television series by 20th Century Fox Television
Television series created by Gregg Hale (producer)
Fiction about urban legends
Works about the Internet
Television series by Haxan Films